Kyboe! is a Dutch upscale fashion brand founded in 2007 by Dutch native Dick Sijmons. KYBOE! Watches are known for their oversized dials and bright colors. In 2015, the company set up a U.S. based office in Boca Raton, Florida, when American investors Bell and Roos acquired a stake in the company.

History 
Dick Sijmons, began making bright, colorful and fashionable plastic watches in 2007, under the name Kyboe, by company Kedtrade. After seeing a positive response within the Netherlands, they expanded the offerings to include more durable stainless steel cases. These steel watches were a huge success, and in 2008, the plastic watches were phased out entirely.

Beginnings 
Kyboe! quickly gained a strong following in its home country of the Netherlands. To grow their customer base, Sijmons brought Kyboe! to the South of France, as well as the Spanish islands Mallorca and Ibiza. Kyboe! signed agreements with individual retailers in each location to start sales and soon had reached over 200.000 watches sold in the Netherlands, Germany, Scandinavia, France   and Spain alone.

New partnership 
Marc Bell discovered Kyboe! in 2008 while vacationing in St. Tropez. He purchased some watches from Nigara and returned to the U.S., where his business partners complimented the watches often. Every year, B returned to St. Tropez and purchased more Kyboe! watches.
In 2014, after having a difficult time importing the brand to the U.S., Bell decided he would become a distributor for the company. He reached out to the founders, Sijmons and de Bruïne, who were unsure whether Kyboe! was ready for the American market. Ultimately, the founders denied B’s request to become a local distributor. Bell recognized the brand's potential and, in 2015, approached Sijmons and de Bruïne with an offer to purchase a portion of the company and become partners. The offer was accepted and a deal was signed in the Spring of 2015. The name belonging to Sijmons as part of the transaction between Kedtrade and Sijmons. B. brought business partner Joseph Roos, an expert in retail and finance, in to the partnership.

Till 2018, the company was headquartered in Boca Raton, Florida, with additional operations in The Netherlands and Hong Kong.

Retail locations 
Kyboe! Under Sijmons was sold by more than 2000 independent retailers around the world. In addition under Marc. B. and Joe Roos, Kyboe! was sold by major retailers including Saks Fifth Avenue, Nordstrom and Lord and Taylor, with new partnerships frequently being announced. Bell, president and CEO of Kyboe!, wanted to expand the line to include bracelets and other accessories over the next 12 months. (read more) 
Creator and designer Sijmons left the company after being fired twice. Less than a year later the company went bankrupt.

Ambassadors 

Separate from Kyboe!’s growing list of ambassadors, a number of celebrities have been spotted wearing Kyboe!
Amanda Lear, Eric Singer, Arnold Schwarzenegger, Dutch model Kim Kötter; Ajax player Jasper Cillessen; DJ’s Tiësto; Steve Aoki; Armin van Buuren; Quintino; DJ Antoine and the Jamaican dancehall artist. Sean Paul;

George Takei, Coco Austin; and Ice-T; were spotted on NYFW wearing Kyboe! as they attended the SS17 show September 10, 2016.

Kyboe!’s first US brand ambassador was DJ Vinny Vinsane, who joined the team on March 3, 2016. Vinsane DJs for well-known venues throughout West Palm Beach, Florida, and is known for his role on ABC's The Bachelorette.

References

External links
 KYBOE! Official Website
 KYBOE! Style Blog
 KYBOE! Club
 KYBOE! Distributors
 KYBOE! Facebook
 KYBOE! Instagram
 KYBOE! Twitter
 KYBOE! Pinterest
 Saks Fifth Avenue
 Nordstrom
 Lord and Taylor

Watch brands
Companies based in The Hague
Clothing companies established in 2007
Dutch brands